Following is a list of thriller films released in the 2010s.

2010

2011

2012

2013

2014

2015

2016

2017

2018

2019

Notes

External links
 25 Best Hollywood Thriller Movies For Best Thrilling Experience

2010s
Thriller